The Bear Street drill hall is a former military installation in Barnstaple, Devon. It is a Grade II listed building.

History
The building was completed in the early 19th century. It became the headquarters of the Royal North Devon Yeomanry in the late 19th century. The regiment was mobilised at the drill hall in August 1914 before being deployed to Gallipoli and, ultimately, to the Western Front. In 1920 the regiment amalgamated with the Royal 1st Devon Yeomanry to form the Royal Devon Yeomanry at Exeter and the drill hall was decommissioned and converted for retail use.

References

Drill halls in England
Barnstaple
Grade II listed buildings in Devon